The 1996 Toyota Grand Prix of Long Beach was the 4th round of the 1996 IndyCar season. It happened on April 14, 1996, on the streets of Long Beach, California.

Race

Start
At the end of lap 1, de Ferran was leading the race, as he led most laps of the race.

Laps 4–39
At lap 4, Brazilian driver André Ribeiro crashed at turn 1. He retired. At lap 14, the top 6 was: Gil de Ferran, Alex Zanardi, Jimmy Vasser, Scott Pruett, Paul Tracy and Parker Johnstone. The 1st caution came out at lap 39, as Zanardi had hit Bobby Rahal at turn 1. Zanardi retired. At the same lap, Robby Gordon had a fire in his pit area. Despite this, Robby did not retire.

Laps 41–65
The top 6 at lap 41 was: de Ferran, Vasser, Tracy, Johnstone, Pruett and Greg Moore. At lap 49, the 2nd caution came out, as Moore collided with Christian Fittipaldi at the last turn before the hairpin. Both retired. Emerson Fittipaldi had hit some debris from that collision, thus, damaging the suspension of his car. He also retired. Al Unser Jr. was now in sixth place. Then, at lap 54, Raul Boesel committed a mistake and missed the turn 1. He would do this again laps later. At lap 57, Robby Gordon had hit Bryan Herta at the hairpin. They did not retired. At lap 65, Teo Fabi, who was replacing Mark Blundell, after he suffered a broken foot at the Rio 400, suffered a puncture. The cause of the puncture, probably, was when he collided with Michael Andretti at the opening laps. Andretti had hit Fabi from behind and damaged his front wing.

Laps 70–95
The 3rd caution came out, as Robby Gordon had hit the wall. The top 10 was: de Ferran, Tracy, Vasser, Johnstone, Unser Jr., Adrian Fernandez, Andretti, Roberto Moreno, Eddie Lawson and Richie Hearn. At the same lap, Paul Tracy was black flagged after overtaking Vasser during caution. He did a stop-and-go penalty one lap later. At lap 95, Dennis Vitolo retired due to mechanical problems

Closing stages
With 4 laps to go, de Ferran suffered mechanical problems and lost the lead to Jimmy Vasser. Then, 1 lap later, Bobby Rahal and Bryan Herta collided at the hairpin. Jimmy Vasser won the race.

Final results

References

Grand Prix of Long Beach
Long Beach
Grand Prix Of Long Beach